Aubert de Villaine is a social economist and co-owner and co-director of the Domaine de la Romanée-Conti. Some of the world's most expensive wines are produced on several of its approximately  vineyard holdings in Vosne-Romanée and Montrachet. He was originally co-director with Lalou Bize-Leroy, both having inherited their ownership. However disagreements over the direction of the estate, led to Bize-Leroy's expulsion from the management and her replacement by her nephew.

Together with his wife Pamela, Aubert also owns and runs a domain in Bouzeron named Domaine de Villaine (alternately A et P de Villaine on some labels). This domain has extensive plantings of Aligoté Doré (golden Aligoté as opposed to the more greenish Aligoté Vert which is considered by many top winemakers in Burgundy to make inferior wine and the de Villaines were part of the campaign to create a separate appellation for the Aligoté wines of Bouzeron, which succeeded in 1998, when the Bouzeron AOC was created.

Aubert de Villaine is also the Director of HdV (Hyde de Villaine) Wines, a highly regarded winery in Napa Valley, California with an adjacent wholly owned 40 acre vineyard. Founded in 2000, most of the partnership's fruit is sourced from the nearby 170 acre Hyde Vineyard in the Los Carneros appellation. 

He served as a judge at the Paris Wine Tasting of 1976.

He is the great-grandson of Peter von Baranoff (Peter’s daughter Olga was Aubert’s maternal grandmother).

References

Further reading

External links
Domaine de Villaine
HdV Wines

French winemakers
Year of birth missing (living people)
Living people